Nicola Pugliese ( Milan, 8 August 1944 - Avella, 25 April 2012 ) was an Italian author and journalist.

He published his debut novel, Malacqua, in 1977. Despite selling out in days, he requested not be reprinted and retired to a private life in Avella. It wasn’t printed again until after his death in 2012.

An English translation of Malacqua (trans. Shaun Whiteside) was published by And Other Stories in 2017.

References

1944 births
2012 deaths
Writers from Milan
Italian male novelists
Italian male journalists
20th-century Italian male writers
20th-century Italian novelists
20th-century Italian journalists
Journalists from Milan